Rosthern is a town in Saskatchewan, Canada.

Rosthern may also refer to:

Rural Municipality of Rosthern No. 403, in Saskatchewan, Canada
Rosthern Junior College, an independent high school in Saskatchewan, Canada
Rosthern-Shellbrook, a provincial electoral district in Saskatchewan, Canada
Rosthern (electoral district), a former federal riding in Saskatchewan, Canada
Rosthern (provincial electoral district), a former provincial riding in Saskatchewan, Canada
HMCS Rosthern, a Canadian navy corvette

See also
Rostherne, a civil parish in Cheshire, England